Mikita Vailupau (born 30 July 1995) is a Belarusian handball player for Telekom Veszprém and the Belarusian national team.

Club career
Vailupau started to play handball in Vitebsk. He played for SKA Minsk in 2014-2019. In 2019, Vailupau signed 3-year contract with HC Meshkov Brest.

On 3 October 2019 Vailupau scored 20 goals in SEHA League match against RK Metaloplastika. It's a record for the goals in one match of SEHA League.

On 5 November Vailupau scored 14 goals in the away match of SEHA League against RK Eurofarm Pelister from North Macedonia (35:32). On 23 November Mikita scored 12 goals after 12 shots in a match in the EHF Champions League against RK Vardar (31:22), becoming the best goalscorer of the match.

International career 
On 25 October 2018 Mikita scored game high 6 goals in Euro 2020 qualification match against Bosnia and Herzegovina in Minsk (29:30).

Achievements
 SEHA League
 Gold: 2022
 Belarusian First League
 Gold: 2020, 2021, 2022

References

External links

HC Meshkov Brest Profile

1995 births
Living people
Belarusian male handball players
Sportspeople from Vitebsk
Veszprém KC players